This list of museums in Michigan encompasses museums which are defined for this context as institutions (including nonprofit organizations, government entities, and private businesses) that collect and care for objects of cultural, artistic, scientific, or historical interest and make their collections or related exhibits available for public viewing. Museums that exist only in cyberspace (i.e., virtual museums) are not included.

Active museums

Defunct museums
 Alamo Township Museum, Alamo Township - Closed 2021
 AutoWorld, Flint
 Anonkas Witch Museum, Caro
 Basement 414, Lansing, closed in 2012
 Cereal City, Battle Creek, closed January 2007
 Detroit Children's Museum, Detroit, closed in 2012 
 Detroit Science Center, closed in fall of 2011, but the new Michigan Science Center is opening in 2012 in the same facility.
 Fred Bear Museum, Grayling, largest private collection of archery artifacts in the world. Moved to Florida in 1985 & closed in 2003.
 Father Marquette National Memorial, museum building destroyed in 2000, features national memorial and a 15-station outdoor interpretive trail
 Keewatin Maritime Museum, 1907 Edwardian steamship, moved to Port McNicoll, Ontario in 2012
 Kresge Art Museum, East Lansing, now the Eli and Edythe Broad Art Museum at Michigan State University
 Labor Museum & Learning Center, Flint
 Lund’s Scenic Garden, Maple City, Michigan.  Closed in November, 1987.  Source:  http://www.hollymetz.net/files/essays_and_articles/Lunds-Scenic-Garden.pdf.
 Michigan Museum of Surveying, Lansing, now the National Museum of Surveying in Springfield, Illinois
 Minibeast Zooseum and Education Center, Lansing  
 Walter P. Chrysler Museum, Auburn Hills, closed in 2012
 Weird Michigan Wax Museum, Moran Township

Regions

Michigan's main regions:
Central Michigan
Flint/Tri-Cities
The Thumb, a subregion of the Flint/Tri-Cities area
Greater Tri Cities
Northern Michigan
Southeast Michigan / Metro Detroit
West Michigan including Michiana
Upper Peninsula of Michigan

See also
 Arboreta in Michigan (category)
 Aquaria in Michigan (category)
 Botanical gardens in Michigan (category)
 Historic landmarks in Michigan
 Houses in Michigan (category)
 Forts in Michigan (category)
 Museums list
 Nature Centers in Michigan
 Observatories in Michigan (category)
 Registered Historic Places in Michigan

References

Resources
Michigan Travel & Tourism: Museums
Michigan Museums Association
Motor Cities National Heritage Area
Northeast Michigan Online, Museums
Hunt's Guide to the Upper Peninsula

Michigan

Michigan culture
Museums
Museums